Perrine Leblanc (born 1980 in Montreal) is a Canadian writer from Quebec. Her debut novel L'homme blanc, published in 2010, won the 2010 , the Governor General's Award for French-language fiction at the 2011 Governor General's Awards, and the 2011 edition of Le Combat des livres.

Leblanc studied at the Université Laval and the Université de Montréal, and worked as an editor with Éditions Leméac in Montreal before publishing L'homme blanc. Following the novel's commercial and award success, a revised edition was published in France in 2011 under the title Kolia.

Her second novel, Malabourg, was published in 2014.

English translations 
Kolia, 2013, House of Anansi Press.
The Lake, 2015, House of Anansi Press.

References

1980 births
Living people
Canadian women novelists
21st-century Canadian novelists
Governor General's Award-winning fiction writers
Writers from Montreal
Université Laval alumni
Université de Montréal alumni
Canadian novelists in French
21st-century Canadian women writers